Veneziano, meaning "of Venice", "from Venice", or "the Venetian", may refer to:

Veneziano (surname), an Italian surname, often derived as a nickname for persons from Venice.
Agostino Veneziano, an Italian engraver of the Renaissance.
Anonimo veneziano (the Anonymous Venetian), a 1970 film.
Il veneziano (The Venetian), the Italian distribution title of the 1987 TV movie, Casanova.
Gabriele Veneziano, an Italian theoretical physicist, a founder of string theory.
Rondò Veneziano, an Italian chamber orchestra incorporating a rock-style rhythm section.
Rondò Veneziano, the eponymous first album produced by Rondò Veneziano.
Stucco Veneziano, a decorative plaster sometimes known simply as "Veneziano".
 The Venetian language. 
 Veneziano amplitude, a four-tachyon amplitude in string theory.
 Veneziano (Feliciano) Vargas, the younger brother of Italy Romano and the national personification of North Italy from the webmanga series Hetalia: Axis Powers. 

Italian-language surnames
Jewish surnames
Surnames of Italian origin
Italian toponymic surnames